This article contains opinion polling in New Hampshire for the 2016 Republican Party presidential primaries. The shading for each poll indicates the candidate(s) which are within one margin of error of the poll's leader.

Polling

Winner  Donald Trump

Primary date February 9, 2016

See also
General election polling
Nationwide opinion polling for the United States presidential election, 2016
Nationwide opinion polling for the United States presidential election by demographics, 2016
Statewide opinion polling for the United States presidential election, 2016

Democratic primary polling
Nationwide opinion polling for the Democratic Party 2016 presidential primaries
Statewide opinion polling for the Democratic Party presidential primaries, 2016

Republican primary polling
Nationwide opinion polling for the Republican Party 2016 presidential primaries

References 

Opinion polling for the 2016 United States presidential election
2016 United States Republican presidential primaries